Butler Township is a township in Vermilion County, Illinois, USA.  As of the 2010 census, its population was 992 and it contained 459 housing units.

History
The township was formed from a portion of Middlefork Township in 1840 and was named after General Benjamin F. Butler, a civil war hero.

Geography

Cities and towns
 Rankin

Unincorporated towns
 East Lynn

Extinct towns
 Hustle
 Pellville
 Reilly

Adjacent townships
 Fountain Creek Township, Iroquois County (north)
 Lovejoy Township, Iroquois County (northeast)
 Grant Township (east)
 Ross Township (east)
 Middlefork Township (south)
 Kerr Township, Champaign County (southwest)
 Button Township, Ford County (west)
 Pigeon Grove Township, Iroquois County (northwest)

Cemeteries
The township contains three cemeteries: East Lynn, Pellville and Rankin.

Major highways
  Illinois State Route 9
  Illinois State Route 49

Airports and landing strips
 Russells Airport

Demographics

School districts
 Hoopeston Area Community Unit School District 11
 Paxton-Buckley-Loda Community Unit School District 10
 Rossville-Alvin Community Unit School District 7

Political districts
 Illinois' 15th congressional district
 State House District 105
 State Senate District 53

References
 U.S. Board on Geographic Names (GNIS)
 United States Census Bureau 2007 TIGER/Line Shapefiles

External links
 US-Counties.com
 City-Data.com
 Illinois State Archives

Townships in Vermilion County, Illinois
Townships in Illinois